2020 Formula One pre-season testing was a series of test sessions sanctioned by the governing body of Formula One, the Fédération Internationale de l'Automobile (FIA) to allow teams to prepare for the 2020 Formula One World Championship. It took place at the Circuit de Barcelona-Catalunya and consisted of two sets of three testing days (19–21 February and 26–28 February). All ten Formula One teams entered for the season took part in the test, and all five tyre compounds were available to teams during the test.

Teams and drivers 

Similarly to the previous year, Mercedes covered the most mileage overall, despite some power unit reliability issues (which was shared by customer team Williams). Williams avoided its problems of 2019 (when it missed two and a half days of running) and participated in the entire test. Haas and Alfa Romeo launched their cars at the first test, while all other teams launched prior to the test between 11 and 17 February. The testing period was somewhat affected by the COVID-19 pandemic. McLaren, for example, banned individuals who had traveled from China in the last 14 days from their motorhome.

The teams alternated between their two drivers, typically on a daily or semi-daily basis. Robert Kubica was the only test driver to take part in the test, driving for Alfa Romeo on both Wednesdays. Sebastian Vettel was scheduled to be the first to drive for Scuderia Ferrari, but missed day one of testing with flu-like symptoms, and his place was taken by Charles Leclerc.

The test 
The Circuit de Barcelona-Catalunya has been used as the venue for pre-season testing for many years, and is favoured by teams because its mix of low and high speed corners. Temperatures at the circuit are cooler in February, so performance at the test differs from performance at the Grand Prix later in the year.

Teams perform both longer race simulation runs and short qualifying simulations, where the fastest times are set. Testing provides the teams with the opportunity to experiment with different versions of the same part, with many employing aero rakes and flow-viz paint to understand the aerodynamic performance of the car.

First test

Day 1 of the test marked the first appearance of the AlphaTauri team, rebranded from Toro Rosso. Esteban Ocon returned to Formula One, now with Renault, after a one-year hiatus. Daniel Ricciardo wore a purple helmet in memory of the recently deceased Kobe Bryant. Hamilton set the fastest time of 1:16.976. On the second day, Mercedes' new dual-axis steering innovation was a major talking point, when in-car footage showed the drivers pulling the steering wheel backwards to activate the device. Sebastian Vettel recovered from his illness to take testing duties in the afternoon session. Kimi Räikkönen set the fastest time of 1:17.091 then caused the first and only red flag of the day when his Alfa Romeo stopped on track coming up to turn 9. Day 3 saw four red flag stoppages to the session: Vettel had a power unit failure at turn 12, Nicholas Latifi's Williams broke down at the end of the main straight, Kevin Magnussen spun and hit the barrier at turn 8, and Ricciardo's Renault also stopped on track. Bottas set the fastest time of either test on day 3, 1:15.732.

Second test

On day 1 of the second test, numerous drivers, including Hamilton, Vettel, Leclerc, George Russell, Sergio Perez and Max Verstappen trialed the C2 prototype tyre designed to address the banked turns at the updated Zandvoort circuit. Pierre Gasly missed most of the morning with a power unit issue, while Alex Albon lost time to suspension issue. Both Ferrari and Williams tested new front wings. There were three red flags, one when Vettel spun, another for Latifi's breakdown, and a third towards the end of the session when both Verstappen and Daniil Kvyat stopped on track. Robert Kubica set the fastest lap of the day: 1:16.942, demonstrating Alfa Romeo's improvement in pace. Day 2 had a wet start, with many teams choosing to go out initially on intermediate tyres. Hamilton broke down with an oil pressure anomaly that ended his running for the day, having completed just 14 laps. The other three red flags were caused by drivers spinning and getting stuck in the gravel: Antonio Giovinazzi (turn 4), Verstappen (turn 5) and Vettel (turn 5). Vettel set the fastest time of the day of 1:16.841. The final day of testing was relatively incident free, with no red flags, and many of the drivers focusing on longer runs, such as Hamilton, Leclerc, Carlos Sainz, and Romain Grosjean. Leclerc completed the most laps of any driver on a single day with 181. Bottas set the fastest lap of the day with a 1:16.196, another lap faster than anyone else managed throughout the entire testing schedule.

Fastest times and overall mileage 

Most fastest times were set on the softest C5 tyres. Pirelli estimated in the previous year that the performance gap between each tyre compound was around 0.6-0.7 s, although this varied based on numerous factors. Bottas' fastest time was three tenths slower than his pole position time from the 2019 Spanish Grand Prix at the same circuit. As of February 2020, his Q2 and Q3 laps from the 2019 Grand Prix and his fastest lap in 2020 testing are the three fastest laps ever at the circuit in its current configuration, and the only three laps under 1:16.000 s.

References 

Pre-season testing
Formula One pre-season testing